Elbistan is a town and district in Kahramanmaraş Province in southern Turkey. Its population is 142,548 (2019) and it is the most populous district of Kahramanmaraş province. It is also the largest district of the province by area and it has the fourth largest plain in the country.

Etymology 
The name "Elbistan" was pronounced similarly in Byzantine and Islamic sources. Elbistan was known as Ablasta according to Armenian historians in the early 11th century. According to Baldric of Dol the city was known as "Ablistan" till 15th century. Egyptian-Mamluk historian Muhammad ibn Iyas wrote the city's name as "Albistan". Alaüddevle Bozkurt Bey from Dulkadirids used the name "Elbistan" in the official documents. After Dulkadirids were conquered by the Ottoman Empire in the 16th century, the current name became prevalent. Among the rural people of Elbistan it is pronounced as "Albıstan". Albistan means "the orchard" in Arabic.

History 

The beginnings of Elbistan are to be found in the mid-10th century and seems to have been settled first by Armenian immigrants. By the end of the 11th century, the town had become the most important one in the Elbistan plain, was fortified against Turkish raiders and was seat of an Armenian bishop.

In 1277 the Mamluks led by Baybars defeated a combined Mongol-Crusader army in the Battle of Elbistan. In 1337 Zeyneddin Karaca Bey captured the town from the Mamluks and established the Beylik of Dulkadir with the region around Elbistan and Marash as its center. The Dulkadirids controlled the region for 178 years until the Ottomans finally conquered it in 1515.

Elbistan became then known as "vilayet-i Türkmân" in the Ottoman documents. Evliya Çelebi's Seyahatnâme from the 17th century gives information about the region that in the mountains and towns mostly reside Turkmens who originally migrated from Bukhara. It seems that some local chiefdoms were given varying degrees of autonomy, notably around the localities of Haticepınar and Kasanlı.

Demographics 
Evliya Çelebi noted that the majority of the town's population was Turkoman in his seyahatname. Currently, the majority of the population of the district is Sunni Turkish with a significant Alevi and Sunni Kurdish population. Turkish Alevis are also present. The Turkmen Alevism of the region is historically rooted in the Alevi Turcoman Beylik of Dulkadir in the 14th century.

Climate

Economy

Coal mining 

The Elbistan coalfield supplies lignite to the nearby Afşin-Elbistan power stations in Afşin.

Environment 
It is said that air pollution in Turkey from the nearby coal-fired power stations also affects Elbistan, as well as smoke from landfill. In late 2020 the oldest plant Afşin-Elbistan A, was said by opposition MP Ali Öztunç to be still operating without filters.

Population

Notable people
Mustafa Atici, Swiss politician of Kurdish descent
Mazlum Çimen, ballet dancer, award-winning film score composer and folk singer
Fidan Doğan, murdered Kurdish activist
Tulay Goren, missing Kurdish schoolgirl
Kemal Gözükara, mathematician, businessman and president of the Istanbul Arel University
Mahir Ünal, Turkish MP and former minister of Culture and Tourism
Tahsin Yücel, Turkish translator, novelist, essayist and literary critic

See also
 İğde – a belde administered by Elbistan

References

External links

 Municipality's official website
 District Governor's official website
 Elbistan Araç Kiralama

 
Populated places in Kahramanmaraş Province
Districts of Kahramanmaraş Province
Towns in Turkey
Former Armenian inhabited settlements